Paul Haranger (22 July 1893 – 27 December 1973) was a French field hockey player. He competed in the men's tournament at the 1920 Summer Olympics.

References

External links
 

1893 births
1973 deaths
French male field hockey players
Olympic field hockey players of France
Field hockey players at the 1920 Summer Olympics
Field hockey players from Paris
20th-century French people